Sucharita Tyagi is an Indian writer, film critic and former radio jockey. She began her career by hosting radio programming in New Delhi, and later gained wider recognition as a creator of web content and YouTube videos for film review platforms.

Born and brought up in New Delhi, India, Tyagi aspired to work in broadcast media from a young age. She found work as a radio jockey at the Delhi-based station Red FM, and later moved to Mumbai, where she gained wider recognition for her work on Radio City. Tyagi transition into web content in the year 2015 when she began recoding YouTube videos for the film review platform, Film Companion. She expanded her career into writing and hosting with a segment entitled "Not a Movie Review", which became popular with the younger audiences of the channel.

Tyagi has since recorded weekly review videos for Film Companion, a select few of which were complied for a web series that was released on Disney+ Hotstar in 2020. In the same year, she started her own YouTube channel for publishing film reviews. Tyagi also writes film reviews for other online portals and was appointed as a member of Film Critics Guild in 2018.

Early life
Sucharita Tyagi was born in New Delhi, India. She spent her childhood in Rohini, a residential district in northwestern part of the Delhi. She was drawn to radio as a child, and would record mock radio programmes growing up. Tyagi attended Modern School, Barakhamba Road and graduate with a major in science. Tyagi's parents wanted her to enroll at a technical college after completing high school, but she instead chose to pursue a career in the performing arts.

Career

Career beginnings and work as radio jockey (2007–14)

After graduating with a degree in Communications Studies and Journalism from the Indraprastha University, Tyagi began working as a voice over artist in New Delhi. At the age of 19 she successfully auditioned for a job as a radio jockey at a Delhi-based FM channel. She worked at the Delhi stations of such channels as Red FM and Big FM, before moving to Mumbai, Maharashtra in 2010 to pursue post graduate education and further her career as a radio station host.

Tyagi enrolled in a filmmaking course at the St. Xavier's College, Mumbai and simultaneously began working as programme host for the Mumbai-based FM station Radio City.  She hosted the popular programme Freedom Live, which was aimed at promoting Indian independent music and featured music from artists and bands performing songs in various regional languages. The show was noted for its emphasis on lesser known artists and music, which was a marked shift from the pop music and Bollywood songs that dominated the network's programming. Tyagi soon began working as a producer with Radio City, while continuing to work as a primetime host for the channel.

During her time with the channel, Tyagi was vocal about the struggles of promoting a niche channel on the medium of radio in India. Talking to Akhil Sood of the Sunday Guardian about the creative overhaul of Hit 95FM, a Delhi-based English radio channel often associated with promoting experimental music, she said that it was a difficult task to get the viewers to tune in to a channel playing a genre of music that was very different from the regular Bollywood tracks. She expressed her disappointment with the rechristening of the channel to promote Bollywood music, saying: "A lot of people will be sad; it makes me sad."

Tyagi soon began hosting Mumbai Masala in the morning slot for Radio City and gained wider recognition for her work as a radio station host. She received attention for a starting a fundraiser to help Nikita Shuklaa visually impaired law student; the story was picked up by several media outlets. Tyagi,  having met Shukla during a talent hunt, used her social media presence and her radio talk show to appeal to the local community to raise money to meet Shukla's college expenses. The campaign was widely shared and received attention from films actors and politicians based in Mumbai, who inturn helped in raising the money.

Wider recognition with YouTube career (2015–present)
Tyagi continued to work with Radio City until 2017, hosting Mumbai Masala; she interviewed various Bollywood and regional artistsincluding Amitabh Bachchan, AR Rahman, Farhan Akhtar, Sunny Deol, Vidya Balan, and Ranbir Kapoorduring her time on the show, but a significant turning point came in her career when she met film critic Anupama Chopra at the 2015 Mumbai Film Festival.  Chopra, who also ran a  film review website Film Companion, was at the time looking to expand the team for the publication's YouTube channel. Tyagi signed up for the same and began sending in her scripts for film reviews to be recorded for the channel.

Tyagi's first review video was released on Film Companions YouTube channel in September 2015 under the title of "Not a Movie Review". Upon release, the series became an instant hit and has since developed a strong following, especially with younger audiences. She talked about the process that went into the making of each episode in an interview with Vox talks: "After watching the film, I note down all the points that I want to talk about. I structure that into a script, pepper it with some jokes [and the] edit is fully taken care of by the Film Companion edit team."

Tyagi was appointed as a member of the Film Critics Guild, one of India's first film critics association as she continued to record weekly reviews for the "Not a Movie Review" series, which has since crossed over 200 episodes on YouTube. The most viewed episode of the series was released on 21 June 2019 and has been watched by over 1.4 million people. The episode featured a review for the Sandeep Reddy Vanga's Kabir Singh and was hailed in media outlets for calling out the film's misogynistic treatment of its lead character and glamorising toxic masculinity.

Tyagi made her film acting debut with a supporting role in the 2019 short film Lutf, co-starring Mona Singh and Vinay Pathak. The film, which follows the life a woman suffering from pagotophobia, or the fear of ice cream, was on released on Sony Liv on 10 October 2019, coinciding with the World Mental Health Day.<ref>{{cite web|url=https://www.outlookindia.com/newsscroll/mona-singh-vinay-pathaks-lutf-to-focus-on-mental-health/1636123|title=Mona Singh, Vinay Pathaks Lutf to focus on mental health|website=Outlook|publisher=|access-date=18 April 2020|date=8 October 2019}}</ref> A select few of episodes of "Not a Movie Review" were later compiled and released as a web series on Disney+ Hotstar under the same title in March 2020. Later that year, Tyagi played herself in Vikramaditya Motwane's black comedy, AK vs AK; also starring Anurag Kashyap and Anil Kapoor as fictionalised versions of themselves, the production utilises a film-within-a-film narrative. AK vs AK was released on Netflix on 20 December to positive response from critics.

Also in 2020, Tyagi launched her own clothing line in partnership with online retailer KadakMerch and started her own YouTube channel, where she posts weekly film reviews under the title "Ghar Se Movie Review". Tyagi also began writing for other online media portals; her film reviews and feature articles on film-related subjects have since appeared in such publications as the Verve magazine, The Cherry Picks, and The Weather Channel. She participated in television debates on cancel culture on NDTV and collaborated with The Quint'' for a video production on sexist online trolls.

Filmography

References

External links
Sucharita Tyagi on Rotten Tomatoes

Indian film critics
Living people
St. Xavier's College, Mumbai alumni
Indian women critics
21st-century Indian journalists
21st-century Indian women writers
21st-century Indian writers
1988 births